Edward Davies (born 1 December 1937) is a Ghanaian boxer. He competed in the men's light middleweight event at the 1964 Summer Olympics.

References

External links
 

1937 births
Living people
Ghanaian male boxers
Olympic boxers of Ghana
Boxers at the 1964 Summer Olympics
Place of birth missing (living people)
Light-middleweight boxers